Zane Nonggorr (born in Australia) is an Australian rugby union player who plays for the  in Super Rugby. His playing position is prop. He was named in the Reds squad for round 6 of the Super Rugby AU competition in 2020.

Reference list

External links
Rugby.com.au profile
itsrugby.co.uk profile

Australian rugby union players
Living people
Rugby union props
Queensland Reds players
2001 births